Neurotic is the fourth EP released by the New Jersey punk band The Bouncing Souls.  It was released on Chunksaah Records in 1994.  All of the songs on here were later released on The Good, The Bad & The Argyle.

Track listing

Side A
"Neurotic"
"The Guest"

Side B
"Some Kind of Wonderful"
"I Like Your Mom"

The Bouncing Souls EPs
1994 EPs
Chunksaah Records EPs